Norman Jay Rambo (November 13, 1941 – March 21, 1994), professionally known as Dack Rambo, was an American actor, widely known for his role as Walter Brennan's grandson Jeff in the series The Guns of Will Sonnett, as Steve Jacobi in the soap opera All My Children, as cousin Jack Ewing on Dallas, and as Grant Harrison on the soap opera Another World.

Early life
Norman Jay Rambo was born in Earlimart, California to William Lester and Beatrice A. Rambo (née Rossi).  He was a middle child in a family of four children. His siblings were William Donald Rambo; identical twin Orman Ray "Dirk" Rambo and sister Beverly Jean Rambo.  Beatrice Rambo outlived two of her three sons.

Career
After moving to Los Angeles in the 1960s, the 20-year-old twins were discovered by actress Loretta Young in 1962 and cast in her CBS series The New Loretta Young Show. On February 5, 1967, Dirk Rambo was killed in a road accident at the age of 25.

Later that same year, Dack Rambo landed the role of Jeff Sonnett on The Guns of Will Sonnett and co-starred in the short-lived Gunsmoke spin-off Dirty Sally, with Jeanette Nolan. During the 1970s and 1980s, he made guest appearances on Marcus Welby, M.D., House Calls, Wonder Woman, Charlie's Angels, Fantasy Island, The Love Boat, Hotel and Murder, She Wrote. He played Steve Jacobi on All My Children in the early 1980s.  He also acted the lead role in Sword of Justice, which lasted for 10 installments in 1978–79. Rambo may be best remembered on television for playing Jack Ewing in 51 episodes of the soap opera Dallas from 1985 to 1987. Rambo also played Wesley Harper on the 1984 short-lived TV series soap opera Paper Dolls.

Rambo promoted a line of men's underwear trademarked in 1987 as "Under Ware by dack rambo" [sic]. While working on Another World, Rambo learned that he was infected with HIV in August 1991. He quit the series shortly thereafter and retired from acting. Rambo then made his HIV infection and his bisexuality public, revealing that he had been in relationships with both men and women since his 20s.

Personal life
For most of his career, Dack Rambo was closeted about his bisexuality, only coming out when he mentioned that he was HIV positive. Also he never married and chose to remain a confirmed bachelor.

Death
Dack Rambo died on March 21, 1994 at the age of 52 of complications from AIDS.

Filmography

References

External links

 
 
 

1941 births
1994 deaths
20th-century American male actors
Male actors from California
AIDS-related deaths in California
American male film actors
American male soap opera actors
American male television actors
Bisexual male actors
People from Tulare County, California
American twins
People from Delano, California
LGBT people from California
Western (genre) television actors
20th-century LGBT people
American bisexual actors